Jurgen Goxha (born 29 December 1992) is an Albanian professional footballer who plays as a defender for Teuta Durrës in the Kategoria Superiore.

Club career
In the first part of 2018–19, while representing Erzeni, Goxha was utilised as a striker by coach Gentian Stojku, scoring an impressive 7 goals in 12 appearances in Albanian First Division. His performances attracted the attention of Tirana, who made a bid for the player in the winter transfer window.

On 28 January 2019, Tirana announced the signing of Goxha on an 18-month contract. He made his debut for his new side on 1 February in a 1–1 home draw against Teuta Durrës, entering in 73rd minute in place of fellow defender Erion Hoxhallari. He was released in August of that year, concluding the second part of 2018–19 season with 16 appearances, including 12 in league.

On 16 August 2019, two days after he was released by Tirana, Goxha joined newly promoted top flight side Bylis Ballsh. He scored his first Albanian Superliga goal on 28 September in a 5–0 home rout of Flamurtari Vlorë, netting the second in the 33rd minute.

On 10 August 2020, Goxha signed a 1+1 year contract with Azerbaijan Premier League side Gabala FK.

On 7 August 2021, Goxha signed for Sabail on a one-year contract.

Personal life
Goxha is a lifelong fan of Albanian club Tirana, for which he played in the second half of 2018–19 season.

Career statistics

Honours
Tirana

Albanian Cup: Runner-up 2018–19

References

External links
Jurgen Goxha at the Albanian Football Association
Jurgen Goxha at Football Database

1992 births
Living people
Footballers from Durrës
Albanian footballers
Association football defenders
KS Iliria players
KF Erzeni players
Besëlidhja Lezhë players
KF Shënkolli players
KF Tirana players
KF Bylis Ballsh players
Gabala FC players
Sabail FK players
Azerbaijan Premier League players
Expatriate footballers in Azerbaijan
Albanian expatriate sportspeople in Azerbaijan
Kategoria Superiore players
Kategoria e Parë players